The Cassis Open Provence is a professional tennis tournament played on hard courts. It is currently part of the ATP Challenger Tour. It has been held in Cassis, France since 2018.

Past finals

Singles

Doubles

ATP Challenger Tour
Hard court tennis tournaments
Tennis tournaments in France